Alejandro O'Reilly, 1st Count of O'Reilly, KOA (October 24, 1723 in Baltrasna, Co. Meath, Ireland – March 23, 1794 in Bonete, Spain), English: Alexander, Count of O'Reilly, Irish: Alastar Ó Raghallaigh, was an Irish-born military reformer and Inspector-General of Infantry for the Spanish Empire in the second half of the 18th century. O'Reilly served as the second Spanish governor of colonial Louisiana, and is the first Spanish official to exercise power in the Louisiana territory after France ceded it to Spain following defeat by Great Britain in the Seven Years' War. For his much appreciated services to the Crown of Spain, O'Reilly was ennobled as a conde de O'Reilly (Count of O'Reilly), and granted a coat of arms.

Origins and military career

Alexander O'Reilly (Irish: Ó Raghallaigh) was born in Baltrasna, Co. Meath, in the Kingdom of Ireland in 1723. His grandfather John Reyly was a colonel in the army of James II, whose regiment—O’Reilly's Dragoons—fought at the siege of Derry. Like many so-called "Wild Geese" of his generation, O'Reilly left Ireland to serve in foreign Catholic armies. He joined Spanish forces fighting in Italy against the Austrians. O'Reilly swore allegiance to Spain and rose to become a brigadier general.

O'Reilly served with the Conde de Ricla in Havana, Cuba, acting as his adjutant and second-in-command. While in Havana, Ricla and O'Reilly received the city back from the British forces that had captured it during the Seven Years' War.

O'Reilly analyzed what had gone wrong with Cuban defenses during the successful British siege of Havana. He recommended sweeping reforms to improve the fortifications, training, practices, and troop organization, which were quickly approved by the Spanish Crown. Under the direction of Silvestre Abarca, a Royal Army military engineer, construction of the strategic La Cabaña fortress began according to O'Reilly's recommendations.

In 1765, King Carlos III sent O'Reilly to Puerto Rico to assess the state of the defenses in that colony. O'Reilly, known today as the "father of the Puerto Rican militia," took a complete census of the island and recommended numerous reforms, including instilling strict military discipline among the local troops. He insisted that the men serving the defense of the realm receive their pay regularly and directly, rather than indirectly from their commanding officers, a long-standing practice that had led to abuses. Some of O'Reilly's recommendations resulted in a massive 20-year program of building up the Castle of Old San Juan, now a World Heritage Site.

Returning to Cuba, O'Reilly married into a prominent Cuban family. His wife, Doña Rosa de Las Casas, was the sister of Luis de Las Casas, who served as governor of Cuba in the 1790s.

O'Reilly was an uncle of Juan MacKenna, a hero of the Chilean War of Independence, as well as a cousin of Hugo Oconór, the founder of Tucson, Arizona, governor of Spanish Texas in the late 1760s and then governor of Yucatán in 1778.

Captain General

O'Reilly was appointed Governor and Captain-General of colonial Louisiana while in Spain in April 1769, with orders to immediately proceed to Havana, embark 3,000 troops there, put down the revolt in Louisiana, and re-establish order. Some French colonists, known as Creoles as they were born in the colony, had worked to expel the first Spanish governor after France ceded this territory.

Arriving in New Orleans in August 1769, O'Reilly took formal possession of Louisiana. O'Reilly held trials and severely punished those French Creoles who were responsible for the expulsion of Spain's first colonial Governor Antonio de Ulloa (1716–1795), from the colony. He is remembered in New Orleans as "Bloody O'Reilly" because he had six prominent rebel French colonists executed, in October 1769. In December 1769 he allowed the Acadians who had settled in present-day Arkansas on the Mississippi River opposite Natchez to resettle on the Amite River near Lakes Maurepas and Pontchartrain. Other French rebels were exiled, and some were sent for life imprisonment in the Morro Castle in Havana.

Having crushed the ringleaders who had led the Louisiana Rebellion of 1768 (the uprising against Ulloa and Spanish rule), O'Reilly sent most of his troops back to Cuba. He concentrated on organizing Louisiana's administration and on stabilizing the food supply. It had historically imported grains from northern French settlements along the Mississippi, as they could not be cultivated near New Orleans.

O'Reilly reformed many French bureaucratic practices which were in place before Spanish rule. Again, as in his 1765 mission to Puerto Rico, O'Reilly's proclamations and rulings affected many aspects of life in Spanish Louisiana. He allowed slaves to purchase their freedom and enabled slave owners to more easily manumit slaves. He banned the trade of Native American slaves and abolished Indian slavery. He regularized the weights and measurements used in marketplaces, regulated doctors and surgeons, and improved public safety by funding bridge and levee maintenance.

Having restored public order, O'Reilly assigned the post of Governor of Louisiana to the Colonel of the Havana Regiment in December 1769, retaining the post of Captain-General for himself. Louisiana was firmly placed as a dependency of the military and political establishment in Cuba.

Return to Spain

Back in Spain after October 1770, O'Reilly was charged to organize six new regiments to be trained near Cádiz, ready for transportation to the Caribbean should a new war between Spain and Great Britain break out.

In 1775, O'Reilly was given command of a major Spanish expedition attacking Algiers. Although this North African campaign was a disaster, the high reputation of O'Reilly was not destroyed, and he continued to serve as captain-general in southern Spain.

He died in the city of Cádiz in 1794, aged 72,  while on his way to take command of an army in the Eastern Pyrenees that had been ordered to oppose invading French revolutionary forces, just after the beheading of Louis XVI.

O'Reilly is buried in the parish church in Bonete in Castile-La Mancha, Spain. A street in Cádiz still bears his name, as does one, Calle O'Reilly/Sráid Ó Raghallaigh, in Old Havana, Cuba. It marks the spot where O'Reilly came ashore in 1763 while the English were embarking to leave.

See also

 Military history of Puerto Rico
 Irish military diaspora
 Irish regiments
 Demetrio O'Daly

References

External links 

1722 births
1794 deaths
People from County Dublin
18th-century Irish people
Counts of Spain
Irish emigrants to Spain
Irish expatriates in Spain
Irish mercenaries
Irish soldiers in the Spanish Army
Governors of Spanish Louisiana
People of the Spanish colonial Americas
Spanish colonial governors and administrators
Spanish generals
Spanish people of Irish descent
Wild Geese (soldiers)
18th-century Puerto Rican people
Irish expatriates in the Spanish Empire